The 2020–21 FC Erzgebirge Aue season is the club's 75th season in existence and the club's 5th consecutive season in the second flight of German football, the 2. Bundesliga, following a 7th-place finish in the previous season. The club will also participate in the DFB-Pokal.

Season summary

Friendly matches

Competitions

2. Bundesliga

League table

Matches 
The league fixtures were announced on 7 August 2020.

DFB-Pokal

Player statistics

Appearances and goals

Transfers

Transfers in

Transfers out

Notes

References

External links

FC Erzgebirge Aue seasons
Erzgebirge Aue